Kan Pisal (born 9 August 1998) is a Cambodian footballer.

International career
Kan Pisal got his first call-up for the under 23 level team in the 2020 AFC U-23 Championship qualification matches from 22 to 26 March 2019.

External links
 Kan Pisal at NationalFootballTeams

Living people
Cambodia international footballers
1998 births
Association football defenders
Competitors at the 2019 Southeast Asian Games
Cambodian footballers
Southeast Asian Games competitors for Cambodia